The Dog Aging Project is a long-term biological study of aging in dogs, centered at the University of Washington. Professors Daniel Promislow and Matt Kaeberlein are the co-directors of the project. Together with Chief Veterinarian, Dr. Kate Creevy, the project primarily focuses on research to understand dog aging through the collection and analysis of big data through citizen science. 
Additionally, there is a small component of the project that explores the use of pharmaceuticals to potentially increase life span of dogs. The project has implications for improving the life spans of humans and is an example of geroscience. 

The project engages the general public to register their dogs in the studies, and therefore the project is an example of citizen science.   nearly 40,000 dogs have been registered with the project.  The majority of the dogs will participate in a longitudinal study of 10,000 dogs over a 10-year period conducted across the United States. Individual dogs are followed for the duration of their lives to understand the biological and environmental factors that influence dog longevity. A small subset of those dogs (approximately 500) will be enrolled in a double-blind, placebo-controlled study of the pharmaceutical rapamycin, which has shown signs of extending longevity in species such as mice. 

The Dog Aging Project is an open science initiative. The investigators have committed to releasing all anonymized research data to the public domain. The longitudinal study portion of the Dog Aging Project bears some similarity to the Golden Retriever Lifetime Study of the Morris Animal Foundation although with much larger phenotypic diversity. The entire project also shares operational similarities to Darwin's Ark, a citizen science initiative of companion animals with more specific focus on genetics. The initiatives are each managed to ensure the data can be integrated into a powerful master data set. 

A premise of the project is that dogs may be a sentinel species for humans since they live in the same environment as humans. The project may thereby help identify risk factors that influence human life span. Since dogs age significantly more rapidly than humans, data on aging can be generated much more rapidly using a dog model than in human studies. A further premise is that the longitudinal portion of the project seeks to understand the underlying biology of aging, as opposed to understanding individual age-related diseases. In this respect, if the aging process itself is addressed, then several age-related diseases could be delayed or avoided simultaneously. This is important because elderly individuals often have multiple chronic disease conditions.

The Dog Aging Project was founded in 2014 and received a US $200,000 seed grant from the University of Washington. It has also received funding from small private donors, an example of crowdfunding. In 2017 the project reported the results of a 10 week trial showing that a small number of dogs that received rapamycin had better heart function than a control group. 
As of 2018, the National Institute on Aging awarded the Dog Aging Project a five year grant to support further studies. Researchers from the Texas A&M College of Veterinary Medicine & Biomedical Sciences are also investigators in the study.

External links
 Dog Aging Project website
 The Healthy Aging and Longevity Research Institute of the University of Washington
 Golden Retriever Lifetime Study

References

Epidemiological study projects
Ageing processes
Senescence in non-human organisms
Dogs
Longevity
Crowdfunding